Behrooz Ghamari-Tabrizi (born 28 June 1960) is an Iranian-born American historian, sociologist, and professor. He is known for his works on the Iranian revolution and its aftermath. Ghamari-Tabrizi serves as the Professor of Near Eastern Studies, and as the Director of the Sharmin and Bijan Mossavar-Rahmani Center for Iran and Persian Gulf Studies at Princeton University.

Career
Ghamari-Tabrizi received a PhD in 1998 from the University of California, Santa Cruz.

He joined Princeton University in February 2019. Previously he was professor of history and sociology and the Director of the Center for South Asian and Middle Eastern Studies at the University of Illinois, Urbana-Champaign. He was awarded a Beckman Fellowship in 2008.

Publications

See also 
 Foucault in Iran: Islamic Revolution after the Enlightenment

References

Living people
1960 births
Iranian sociologists
University of Illinois faculty
Princeton University faculty
20th-century Iranian historians
21st-century American historians
American male non-fiction writers
American sociologists
University of Illinois Urbana-Champaign faculty
University of California, Santa Cruz alumni
21st-century American male writers
Iranian emigrants to the United States